Evidence is a solo album by American jazz pianist Mal Waldron recorded in Canada and released on the Canadian Dark Light Music label.

Reception
The Allmusic review by Ken Dryden awarded the album 4 stars, stating: "The pianist's interpretations of standards on this date are among the best of his career."

Track listing 
All compositions by Mal Waldron except where noted.

 "Yesterdays" (Otto Harbach, Jerome Kern) — 8:09 
 "No Kick" — 7:54 
 "Dear Old Stockholm" (Traditional) — 5:50 
 "Rhapsodic Interlude #1" — 8:55 
 "Evidence" (Thelonious Monk) — 3:48 
 "Let's Call This" (Monk) — 4:07 
 "Rhapsodic Interlude #2" — 14:42 
 "How Long Has This Been Going On?" (George Gershwin, Ira Gershwin) — 5:15 
Recorded in Toronto, Canada, on March 14, 1988

Personnel 
 Mal Waldron – piano

References 

1991 albums
Mal Waldron albums
Solo piano jazz albums